Zhang Chen may refer to:
 Zhang Chen (footballer)
 Zhang Chen (volleyball)
 , Minister of Nuclear Industry of the People's Republic of China.